Kilcooly is a civil parish in the barony of Slieveardagh., County Tipperary.

See also
 List of civil parishes of County Tipperary

References

Civil parishes of Slievardagh